Jin Hongyu (born 23 April 1989 in Changchun) is a Chinese footballer of Korean descent.

Club career
Jin Hongyu started his professional football career in 2011 when he was promoted to Yanbian FC's first squad. On 2 April 2016, Jin made his Super League debut in a 1–0 home victory against Beijing Guoan, coming on as a substitute for Jiang Hongquan in the 93rd minute.

In February 2018, Jin transferred to China League Two side Jilin Baijia.
In February 2019, Jin transferred to fellow League Two side Qingdao Jonoon.

Career statistics
Statistics accurate as of match played 31 December 2020.

Honours

Club
Yanbian FC
 China League One: 2015

References

External links

1989 births
Living people
Chinese footballers
Association football defenders
Footballers from Changchun
Yanbian Funde F.C. players
Qingdao Hainiu F.C. (1990) players
Chinese Super League players
China League One players
Chinese people of Korean descent